Maria Yvett Garcia De La Cruz (born 4 July 1996) is a Dominican volleyball player.

She played for the Dominican Republic national team at the 2015 FIVB World Grand Prix.

She played for Florida A&M.

Clubs 
  Mirador (2015)

References 

1996 births
Living people
Dominican Republic women's volleyball players
Middle blockers
Expatriate volleyball players in the United States
Dominican Republic expatriate sportspeople in the United States
Florida A&M Lady Rattlers volleyball players
21st-century Dominican Republic women